Gliese 673 is an orange dwarf star in the constellation Ophiuchus. It has a stellar classification of K7V. Main sequence stars with this spectra have a mass in the range of 60–70% of solar mass (comparable to the members of the binary star system 61 Cygni).

This star is relatively near the Sun at a distance of about 25 light-years. In spite of this proximity, however, it is still too faint to be viewed by the unaided eye. It is considered a slowly rotating star with a relatively high proper motion.

Gliese 673 is among nearby K-type stars of a type in a 'sweet spot' between Sun-analog stars and M stars, in terms of the likelihood of life and its ease of detectability (in this case for planets in the system's outer conservative habitable zone), per analysis of Giada Arney from NASA's Goddard Space Flight Center.

See also
 List of star systems within 25–30 light-years

References

External links
 ARICNS

Ophiuchus (constellation)
157881
K-type main-sequence stars
0673
085295
0718
Durchmusterung objects